is a Fukuoka City Subway station serving Fukuoka Airport in Fukuoka prefecture, Japan. The station symbol is a blue airplane and a cloud. This is the only subway station in Japan which directly connects with an airport.

History
The station opened on 3 March 1993.

Lines
The station is served by the Fukuoka City Subway Kūkō Line.

Station layout
The platforms are located on the 2nd basement level.

Vicinity
Fukuoka Airport
Terminal 1, 2, 3 and International Terminal
Fukuoka Airport Police Station
Fukuokakūkōnai Post Office
Bus terminal (with. Airport Express bus)
Higashihirao Park: Level-5 stadium

References

External links
 Fukuoka City Subway Fukuokakūkō Station information 

Railway stations in Japan opened in 1993
Kūkō Line (Fukuoka City Subway)
Railway stations in Fukuoka Prefecture
Airport railway stations in Japan